In mathematics, the residue formula says that the sum of the residues of a meromorphic differential form on a smooth proper algebraic curve vanishes.

Statement
In this article, X denotes a proper smooth algebraic curve over a field k. A meromorphic (algebraic) differential form  has, at each closed point x in X, a residue which is denoted . Since  has poles only at finitely many points, in particular the residue vanishes for all but finitely many points. The residue formula states:

Proofs

 proves the theorem using a notion of traces for certain endomorphisms of infinite-dimensional vector spaces. The residue of a differential form  can be expressed in terms of traces of endomorphisms on the fraction field  of the completed local rings  which leads to a conceptual proof of the formula.

References

Algebraic geometry
Algebraic curves
Differential forms